Annette Tison, (born in 1942 in Hossegor, France) is a French architect and writer, mainly known for being co-creator of the Barbapapa series  with her American husband, Talus Taylor.

Tison graduated from the École Spéciale d'Architecture. She co-created the characters of the Barbapapa which was initially published as an album in 1970, before becoming a cartoon and a magazine in 1976.

References 

20th-century French architects
20th-century French women writers
French women architects
French illustrators
French women illustrators
French children's book illustrators
French children's writers
French women children's writers
French comics artists
French female comics artists
1942 births
Living people
People from Landes (department)
École Spéciale d'Architecture alumni